Captain Ian McNaught,  (born 1954) is Deputy Master of Trinity House, and was Captain of ships for Cunard and Seabourn including the last Captain of the Queen Elizabeth 2 (QE2).

Education
He studied at Monkwearmouth Academy in Sunderland.

Career
He started his seagoing career on oil tankers working for BP.

1987-2009: Cunard

Captain McNaught joined Cunard in September 1987 as a Second Officer on the QE2.  In 1989 he joined the Cunard Princess as First Officer.  In 1991 he returned to the QE2 as First Officer until September 1994 when he was promoted to Chief Officer.  In 1996 he became Chief Officer on Sea Goddess II and then Staff Captain on board the QE2 in 1999.  His first command was in June 2001, when he became master of Sea Goddess I.  In April 2003 he took over as the QE2's 21st master. He was in command of the QE2 on its final voyage around the UK, including to the River Tyne where an estimated 50,000 people attended to watch the ship. He remained onboard, in command of the QE2 for her subsequent final voyage to Dubai in November 2008 serving as her final Captain. He then supervised the handover and transition to her new owners in Dubai.

In March 2009 he took command of MS Queen Victoria until he resigned in 2010 to join Seabourn.

2010 to 2011: Seabourn
Captain McNaught took command of Seabourn Spirit in February 2010.

2011 to date: Trinity House
Captain McNaught joined Trinity House in September 2011 as Deputy Master.

In 2019, McNaught was reported that it was not an easy decision for Trinity House to have decided to decommission the Royal Sovereign Lighthouse near Eastbourne.

In November 2022, Captain McNaught acted on behalf of the Princess Royal at the 2022 award ceremony for the UK Merchant Navy Medal for Meritorious Service.

Awards
In 2019, he was appointed Command in the Royal Victorian Order in the New Year Honours List.

Personal life
He is married to his wife Susan and has one son, Steven.

References 

Living people
1955 births
Ship captains of the Cunard Line
British Merchant Navy officers
Commanders of the Royal Victorian Order